Søvde may refer to:

Søvde, an old name for Sauda municipality, Rogaland, Norway
Søvde, an old name for Syvde municipality, Møre og Romsdal, Norway